Arvid Laurentius Laurin (3 October 1901 – 6 May 1998) was a Swedish sailor. He was a crew member of the boat Sunshine that won the silver medal in the Star class at the 1936 Summer Olympics.

References

1901 births
1998 deaths
Swedish male sailors (sport)
Olympic sailors of Sweden
Sailors at the 1936 Summer Olympics – Star
Olympic silver medalists for Sweden
Olympic medalists in sailing
Royal Swedish Yacht Club sailors
Medalists at the 1936 Summer Olympics